Cusca District is one of seven districts of the Corongo Province in Peru.

Geography 
Some of the highest mountains of the district are listed below:

See also 
 Llamaqucha

References

Districts of the Corongo Province
Districts of the Ancash Region